Quercus × macdonaldii, formerly Quercus macdonaldii, with the common names MacDonald's oak and Macdonald oak, is a rare hybrid species of oak in the family Fagaceae.

Distribution
The tree is endemic to the California Channel Islands, on Santa Cruz Island, Santa Rosa Island, and Santa Catalina Island, in Southern California. It is found in chaparral and woodlands habitats in canyons and slopes below .

Taxonomy
The plant was reclassified as Quercus × macdonaldii, a naturally occurring hybrid of Quercus lobata and Quercus pacifica, or possibly other oak species. Both parents are placed in section Quercus.

See also
California chaparral and woodlands ecoregion
California coastal sage and chaparral sub-ecoregion

References

External links
 Jepson eFlora treatment of Quercus × macdonaldii
 USDA Plants Profile for Quercus × macdonaldii  [berberidifolia × lobata]  (MacDonald oak)
  Calflora Database: Quercus × macdonaldii (MacDonald's oak, MacDonald oak)

macdonaldii
Endemic flora of California
Natural history of the Channel Islands of California
Natural history of the California chaparral and woodlands
Natural history of Los Angeles County, California
Trees of the Southwestern United States
Hybrid plants
Taxonomy articles created by Polbot